Zographus is a genus of beetle belonging to the family Cerambycidae.

List of species
 Zographus aulicus Bertoloni, 1849
 Zographus cingulatus Aurivillius, 1913
 Zographus hieroglyphicus Gerstäcker, 1855
 Zographus lineatus (Quedenfeldt, 1882)
 Zographus nitidus (Aurivillius, 1914)
 Zographus niveipectus (Quedenfeldt, 1888)
 Zographus niveisparsus (Chevrolat, 1844)
 Zographus oculator (Fabricius, 1775)
 Zographus plicaticollis Thomson, 1868
 Zographus pulverulentus Nonfried, 1906
 Zographus quadrimaculatus Gilmour, 1956
 Zographus regalis (Browning, 1776)
 Zographus scabricollis (Quedenfeldt, 1882)

References
 F. Vitali – Cerambycoidea
 Biolib

Sternotomini